Walk Through This World with Me is an album by American country music artist George Jones released in 1967 (see 1967 in country music) on the Musicor Records label.

Background
The song "Walk Through This World With Me" would become a number one hit for Jones in 1967, his first chart topper in five years.  According to Bob Allen's book George Jones: The Life and Times of a Honky Tonk Legend, Jones was less than enthusiastic about the "musically middle-of-the-road love ballad that was almost inspirational in its unabashedly optimistic and romantic sentiments - a far cry from 'The Window Up Above,'" and it was only at his producer H.W. "Pappy" Daily's insistence that he recorded the song at all.  In the 1994 retrospective Golden Hits, Jones states that he was unhappy with his singing on the LP version and, after the song started getting heavy airplay in Chicago, he told his manager Pappy Daily that he wanted to recut it.  "The single record on it was different, even though it was almost the same, I did a little better job singing the single than I did on the album." Jones would perform the song in concert throughout his career, often as part of an "oldies" medley.

Walk Through This World With Me features two songs associated with a couple of people who would soon figure prominently in Jones's life: singer Tammy Wynette and producer Billy Sherrill.  "Apartment No. 9" had been co-written by former Jones Boy Johnny Paycheck and had been a minor hit for Wynette in 1966, a new singer in the country music world who would eventually become Jones's third wife.  Wynette was discovered by Sherrill, who co-wrote the sentimental country standard "Almost Persuaded" and would eventually produce Jones throughout the 1970s and 1980s.

Buoyed by the popularity of the title track, Walk Through This World With Me would rise to number two on the country music album chart.

Track listing 
 "Walk Through This World With Me" (Sandy Seamons, Kaye Savage)
 "The Shoe Goes on the Other Foot Tonight" (Buddy Mize)
 "Sweet Thang" (Nat Stuckey)
 "Am I That Easy to Forget" (Carl Belew, W.S. Stevenson)
 "Apartment No. 9" (Johnny Paycheck, Bobby Austin)
 "There Goes My Everything" (Dallas Frazier)
 "Life Turned Her That Way" (Harlan Howard)
 "Almost Persuaded" (Billy Sherrill, Glenn Sutton)
 "Lonely Street" (Carl Belew, W.S. Stevenson, Kenny Sowder)
 "Don't Do It Darlin'" (Webb Pierce)

References

External links
 George Jones' Official Website

1967 albums
George Jones albums
Albums produced by Pappy Daily
Musicor Records albums